Lewis Spence may refer to:
 Lewis Spence (1874–1955), Scottish journalist, poet, author, folklorist and occult scholar
 Lewis Spence (footballer) (born 1996), Scottish footballer for Scunthorpe United

See also
 Lewwis Spence (born 1987), English footballer